P3 Gull (in ), is a music show and an award ceremony organized by the Norwegian radio station NRK P3. P3 Gold was first held on 29 November 2013 at Sentrum Scene in Oslo. It dealt Awards in four categories: "Newcomer of the Year" (Årets nykommer), "Live Artist of the Year" (Årets liveartist), "Song of the Year" (Årets låt) and "P3-Prize" (P3-prisen). The live shows will primarily be a meeting between the audience and the music being played on P3.

The program has won six "Professional Award" under Gullruten: class for best directing multi-camera three times (2014, 2015 and 2016); all by Nicolai Sørensen, Best Cinematography twice (2014, 2016); Henning Våge and Mats Lian and "Best Sound Design", "Art Direction", "Production design" in 2016 by Audun Stjernstad and Joakim Faxvaag.

Prize winners

P3 Gull 2013 
 Årets nykommer: Cashmere Cat
 Årets liveartist: Kaizers Orchestra
 Årets låt: "Running to The Sea" – Röyksopp and Susanne Sundfør
 P3-prisen: Karpe Diem
Arranged on November 29, 2013 Sentrum Scene in Oslo where Live Nelvik hosted as presenter.

P3 Gull 2014 
 Årets nykommer: Kygo
 Årets liveartist: OnklP & De fjerne slekningene
 Årets låt: "Styggen på ryggen" – OnklP & De fjerne slekningene
 P3-prisen: Susanne Sundfør
Arranged on November 29, 2014, at H3 Arena in Oslo where Live Nelvik hosted as presenter.

P3 Gull 2015 
 Årets nykommer: Astrid S
 Årets liveartist: Honningbarna
 Årets låt: "2 AM" – Astrid S
 P3-prisen: Lars Vaular
Arranged on November 28, 2015, at H3 Arena in Oslo where Christine Dancke and Leo Ajkic hosted as presenters.

P3 Gull 2016 
 Årets nykommer: Cezinando
 Årets liveartist: Karpe Diem
 Årets låt: "Lett å være rebell i kjellerleiligheten din" – Karpe Diem
 P3-prisen: Röyksopp
Arranged on November 26, 2016, at the Central in Oslo where Live Nelvik and Ronny Brede Aase hosted as presenters.

P3 Gull 2017 
 Årets nykommer: Sigrid
 Årets liveartist: Karpe Diem
 Årets låt: "Håper du har plass" – Cezinando
 P3-prisen: OnklP
Arranged on November 25, 2017, at Skur 13, Tjuvholmen in Oslo where Live Nelvik and Leo Ajkic hosted as presenters.

Other nominees:
 Årets nykommer: Hkeem, Kjartan Lauritzen, Amanda Delara, inda Vidala
 Årets liveartist: Gabrielle, Kjartan Lauritzen, Sigrid, Lüt
 Årets låt: Linda Vidala and KingSkurkOne – "Bængshot", Sigrid – "Don't Kill My Vibe", Arif – "Alene", Hkeem and Temur – "Fy faen"

P3 Gull 2018 
 Årets nykommer: Boy Pablo
 Årets liveartist: Cezinando
 Årets låt: "Strangers" – Sigrid
 P3-prisen: Ina Wroldsen
Arranged on November 24, 2018, at Skur 13, Tjuvholmen in Oslo where Herman Flesvig hosted as presenter.

Other nominees:
 Årets nykommer: Halie, Myra, Virkelig, Ruben
 Årets liveartist: Sigrid, Arif and Unge Ferrari, Fieh, Kjartan Lauritzen
 Årets låt: Seeb and Dagny – "Drink About", Ina Wroldsen – "Strongest", Cezinando and Chirag – "Er dette alt", Emilie Nicolas – "Feel Fine"

P3 Gull 2019 
 Årets nykommer: Isah
 Årets liveartist: Karpe
 Årets låt: "Hallo" – Isah and Dutty Dior
 P3-prisen: Kygo
Arranged on November 30, 2019, at Malersalen, NRK Marienlyst in Oslo where  Ronny Brede Aase hosted as presenter.

Other nominees:
 Årets nykommer: SKAAR, ISÁK, Girl in Red, Emma Steinbakken
 Årets liveartist: Pasha, Brenn., Sondre Justad, L.U:N.A
 Årets låt: Sondre Justad – "Fontena på Youngstorget", Karpe – "Sas Pussy", Sigrid – "Don't Feel Like Crying", Arif – "Hvem er hun"

P3 Gull 2020 
 Årets nykommer: Musti
 Årets artist: Girl in Red
 Årets låt: "Somebody" – Dagny
 P3-prisen: Gabrielle
Arranged on November 28, 2020, at the old Deichman Library with Jonis Josef, Henrik Farley and Martin Lepperød as presenters.

Other nominees:
 Årets nykommer: Kamara, Sebastian Zalo, B-Boy Myhre, and Zupermaria
 Årets artist: Dagny, Boy Pablo, Ruben, Astrid S
 Årets låt: "Kiss somebody" - Julie Bergan + Seeb, "Nå er det oss" - Amanda Delara, "Hey Girl" - Boy Pablo and "Dance" - CLMD and Tungevaag

Interval act

2013 
 Nico & Vinz – "Am I Wrong"
 Truls – "Out of Yourself"
 Emilie Nicolas – "Pstereo"
 Lars Vaular with Arif and Kaveh
 CLMD – "Stockholm Syndrome"
 Kvelertak – "Kvelertak"
 Karpe Diem – "Jens"

2014 
 Highasakite – "Lover, Where Do You Live?"
 Gabrielle – "5 fine frøkner"
 Team Me – "F is For Faker"
 Sondre Justad – "Nu har du mæ"
 Marit Larsen – "I Don't Want to Talk About It"
 Susanne Sundfør – "Fade Away"
 Röyksopp with Jamie Irrepressible – "I Had This Thing"

2015 
 Act 1: Karpe Diem – "Hvite menn som pusher 50"
 Act 2: Lemaitre feat. Jennie A. – "Closer"
 Act 3: Carl Louis feat. Ary – "Telescope"
 Act 4: OnklP & De fjerne slekningene – "B-film"
 Act 5: Daniel Kvammen – "Du fortenar ein som meg"
 Act 6: Aurora – "Running with the Wolves"
 Act 7: Nico & Vinz – "That's How You Know"

2016 
 Act 1: Alan Walker with Ingrid Helene Håvik – "Faded"
 Act 2: Dagny with Kristian Kristensen – "Fool's Gold"
 Act 3: Astrid S with dePresno – "Hurts So Good"
 Act 4: Cezinando – "Botanisk hage"
 Act 5: Julie Bergan – "Arigato"
 Act 6: Matoma with Becky Hill – "False Alarm"

2017 
 Act 1: Cezinando – "Håper du har plass"
 Act 2: Sigrid – "Don't Kill My Vibe"
 Act 3: Arif – "Alene"
 Act 4: Linda Vidala and KingSkurkOne – "Bængshot"
 Act 5: Sondre Justad – "Paradis"
 Act 6: Hkeem and Temur – "Fy faen"

2018 
Sigrid – "Sucker Punch"
EMIR – "10 ting"
Unge Ferrari – "Balkong"
Girl in Red – "I Wanna Be Your Girlfriend"
Dagny – "Used To You"
Emilie Nicolas – "Feel Fine"
Astrid S – "Emotion"

Awards and nominations

See also 
 P3 Guld – its Danish and Swedish equivalent

References

External links 
 P3 Gull Website
 P3 Gull 2013 Live stream
 P3 Gull 2014 Live stream
 P3 Gull 2015 Live stream
 P3 Gull 2016 Live stream
 P3 Gull 2017 Live stream
 P3 Gull 2018 Live stream

Norwegian music awards